is a private university in Hanamaki, Iwate, Japan, established in 1965.

Notable alumni
Katsuyuki Aihara baseball player
Diego Franca baseball player
Kyohei Nakamura baseball player
Misaki Ozawa field hockey player
Kodai Sato football player
Makoto Sawaguchi basketball player
Shigehiro Taguchi basketball player
Tokuichiro Tamazawa politician
Shuta Tonosaki baseball player
Hotaka Yamakawa baseball player

External links
 Official website 

Educational institutions established in 1965
Private universities and colleges in Japan
Universities and colleges in Iwate Prefecture
1965 establishments in Japan
Hanamaki, Iwate